Elvis Vermeulen is a former French rugby union footballer. He played for ASM Clermont Auvergne and CA Brive in the top level of French rugby, the Top 14 competition. He has also played for the French national team, earning his first cap on 16 June 2001 against South Africa. He scored the championship winning try of the 2007 Six Nations against Scotland. This try meant France won the championship on points difference ahead of Ireland.

External links
 Elvis Vermeulen on lequipe.fr

1979 births
Living people
French rugby union players
ASM Clermont Auvergne players
France international rugby union players
Rugby union number eights